Mohan Bahadur Basnet is a Nepalese politician. He  served as the member of the Pratinidhi Sabha and the 2nd Constituent Assembly from Sindhupalchok-1, having been elected in the 1999 and 2013 elections, representing Nepali Congress.

He served as the Minister for Information and Communication from 2017–2018 in the fourth Deuba cabinet, having previously served as the State Minister of Health under Deuba from 2001–2002.

References

Nepali Congress politicians from Bagmati Province
Living people
Nepal MPs 1999–2002
People from Sindhupalchowk District
Members of the 2nd Nepalese Constituent Assembly
Nepal MPs 2022–present
1958 births